Environment, health and safety (EHS) is the set that studies and implements the practical aspects of protecting the environment and maintaining health and safety at occupation. In simple terms it is what organizations must do to make sure that their activities do not cause harm to anyone. Commonly, quality - quality assurance and quality control - is adjoined to form the company division known as HSQE.

From a safety standpoint, it involves creating organized efforts and procedures for identifying workplace hazards and reducing accidents and exposure to harmful situations and substances. It also includes training of personnel in accident prevention, accident response, emergency preparedness, and use of protective clothing and equipment.

Better health at its heart, should have the development of safe, high quality, and environmentally friendly processes, working practices and systemic activities that prevent or reduce the risk of harm to people in general, operators, or patients.

From an environmental standpoint, it involves creating a systematic approach to complying with environmental regulations, such as managing waste or air emissions all the way to helping site's reduce the company's carbon footprint.

Regulatory requirements play an important role in EHS discipline and EHS managers must identify and understand relevant EHS regulations, the implications of which must be communicated to executive management  so the company can implement suitable measures. Organizations based in the United States are subject to EHS regulations in the Code of Federal Regulations, particularly CFR 29, 40, and 49. Still, EHS management is not limited to legal compliance and companies should be encouraged to do more than is required by law, if appropriate.

Other names 
Notwithstanding the individual importance of these attributes, the various institutions and authors have accented the acronyms differently. Successful HSE programs also include measures to address ergonomics, air quality, and other aspects of workplace safety that could affect the health and well-being of employees and the overall community. Another researcher transformed it as SHE in 1996, while exploring the "concept of 'human quality' in terms of living standards that must follow later than the health.....[as per the] paradigm of SHEQ, ....raising up the importance of environment to the 'safety of people as a prime consideration'". It is because "Safety First" is called in for the commitment to transform the safety culture of countries. Quality is "fitness for purpose", and without it, each and every endeavour will be futile. 

Other abbreviations than HSE, SHE, HSQE are also used:

Regulatory agencies

United Kingdom 
 The Health and Safety Executive
 The Environment Agency
 Local authorities

United States 
  Federal / international
  Occupational Safety and Health Administration (OSHA)
  Environmental Protection Agency (EPA)
  Nuclear Regulatory Commission (NRC)
  Mining Safety and Health Administration (MSHA), etc.
  European Union (EU standards) – Health and Safety At Work Act 
Bureau of Safety and Environmental Enforcement (BSEE)
  State
  Safety and Health Council of North Carolina, Massachusetts Nuclear Regulatory Commission, etc.
  Local
  Municipal fire departments (building code inspections)
Environmental Management Agency (EMA)

Zambia 
 Zambia Environmental Management Agency
 Radiation Protection Agency
 Occupational Health and Safety Institute
 Mine Safety Department

General categories 
EHS guidelines cover categories specific to each industry as well as those that are general to most industry sectors. Examples of general categories and subcategories are:

Specific categories

History

The chemical industry introduced the first formal EHS management approach in 1985 as a reaction to several catastrophic accidents (like the Seveso disaster of July 1976 and the Bhopal disaster of December 1984). This worldwide voluntary initiative, called "Responsible Care", started by the Chemistry Industry Association of Canada (formerly the Canadian Chemical Producers' Association - CCPA), operates in about 50 countries, with central coordination provided by the International Council of Chemical Associations (ICCA). It involves eight fundamental features which ensure plant and product safety, occupational health and environmental protection, but which also try to demonstrate by image-building campaigns that the chemical industry acts in a responsible manner. Being an initiative of the ICCA, it is restricted to the chemical industry.

Since the 1990s, general approaches to EHS management that may fit any type of organisation have appeared in international standards such as:
The Valdez Principles, that have been formulated to guide and evaluate corporate conduct towards the environment. 
 the Eco-Management and Audit Scheme (EMAS), developed by the European Commission in 1993
 ISO 14001 for environmental management in 1996
 ISO 45001 for occupational health and safety management in 2018, preceded by OHSAS 18001 1999
In 1998 the International Finance Corporation established EHS guidelines.

Example 
As a typical example, the activities of a health, safety and environment (HSE) working group might focus on:

 exchange of know-how regarding health, safety and environmental aspects of a material
 promotion of good working practices, such as post-use material collection for recycling

Publications
 Occupational Safety and Health Administration (United States)
 American Society of Safety Engineers
 Canadian Centre for Occupational Health and Safety (CCOHS)
 EHS Today
 Safety+Health Magazine – National Safety Council
 Environmental Leader
 EU-OSHA
 ISHN
 NIOSH
 OHS

See also
 Occupational safety and health
 National Safety Council
 Robert W. Campbell Award, an Award for Business Excellence through EHS Management.
 Safety engineering

References

External links
NAEM, the premier Association for EHS Management: What is EHS?
International Finance Corporation: World Bank Group Environmental, Health, and Safety Guidelines
International Network for Environmental Management

Occupational safety and health